Anthony Terrence Thompson (November 15, 1954 – November 12, 2003) was an American session drummer best known as the drummer of the Power Station and a member of Chic.

Early life and education
Thompson was raised in the middle-class community of Springfield Gardens, in Queens, New York City. His mother was Trinidadian and father was of Antiguan descent.

Career

Chic
Thompson first drummed for the group Labelle, and then for a short while was a member of the soul/disco band Ecstasy, Passion & Pain. This was followed by a long tenure with Chic, where he helped create hits such as "Dance, Dance, Dance (Yowsah, Yowsah, Yowsah)," "Le Freak," and "Good Times". He also performed with members of Chic on "We Are Family" and "He's the Greatest Dancer" by Sister Sledge and "Upside Down" and "I'm Coming Out" by Diana Ross.

Following the temporary disbanding of Chic in 1983, Chic's former guitarist and bassist, Nile Rodgers and Bernard Edwards became prolific producers, and Thompson's drumming was much in demand among their clients. Thompson appeared with numerous artists such as Jody Watley, Madonna (on her 1984 album Like a Virgin), Rod Stewart, Robert Palmer and David Bowie.

Other bands
Thompson was also a member of the band the Power Station along with Robert Palmer, and John Taylor and Andy Taylor of Duran Duran. The Live Aid charity benefit concert in 1985 saw Thompson filling in and playing with the Power Station as well as joining the remaining members of Led Zeppelin on stage (along with Phil Collins) at John F. Kennedy Stadium. Page, Plant and Jones then invited Thompson in England for rehearsals for a Led Zeppelin reunion which was canceled by Jimmy Page after Thompson was badly injured in a car crash.

He went on to join groups such as the Distance and Crown of Thorns with Jean Beauvoir (playing on their first album Crown of Thorns before leaving the band and subsequently replaced by Hawk Lopez). Thompson was also a founding member of the band That Hideous Strength. In the mid 1990s he rejoined Power Station for their 1996 reunion album Living in Fear and subsequent tour. Thompson's final project was called Non-Toxic which he formed with bassist Michael Paige (Crown of Thorns) and guitarist Dave Scott; Thompson died before finishing the project's first album.

He played with David Bowie on the Serious Moonlight Tour.

Death and legacy
Three days before his 49th birthday, Thompson died on November 12, 2003, in Los Angeles, within a month of being diagnosed with renal cell carcinoma (kidney cancer), and two months after the death of The Power Station bandmate Robert Palmer from a heart attack.  Thompson was a member of the band Non-Toxic at the time of his death. He was survived by his wife, two children, and his sister, Cookie. On September 19, 2005, like his former band member Bernard Edwards, Thompson was honored posthumously along with the rest of the Chic band members by being inducted into the Dance Music Hall of Fame.

Thompson was a very influential drummer. Rock musician Dave Grohl admitted to being heavily inspired by him.

Discography

with Chic
 Chic (1977)
 C'est Chic (1978)
 Risqué (1979)
 Real People (1980)
 Take It Off (1981)
 Tongue in Chic (1982)
 Believer (1983)

with Sister Sledge
 We Are Family (1979)
 Love Somebody Today (1980)

with Diana Ross
 Diana (1980)

with Debbie Harry
 KooKoo (1981)

with Power Station
 The Power Station (1985)
 Living in Fear (1996)

with Distance
 Under the One Sky (1989)

with Crown of Thorns
 The Black CD EP (1991)
 Crown of Thorns (1994)

Guest appearances
 Let’s Dance (1983) ("Without You", "Cat People (Putting Out Fire)", 2 more tracks)
 The Serious Moonlight Tour (performed live with David Bowie) (1983)
 "Like a Virgin", "Material Girl", "Love Don’t Live Here Anymore", "Shoo-Bee-Doo" (from the Madonna album, Like a Virgin) (1984)
 "Rock and Roll", "Whole Lotta Love", "Stairway to Heaven" (performed live with Led Zeppelin & Phil Collins at Live Aid) (1985)
 Some People (several tracks on the Belouis Some album) (1985)
 "Hard Woman" (from the Mick Jagger album, She's the Boss) (1985)
 "Hyperactive", "Addicted to Love", "I Didn't Mean to Turn You On", "Riptide" (from the Robert Palmer album, Riptide) (1985)
 "Lost in You", "Forever Young", "The Wild Horse", "Dynamite", "Try a Little Tenderness", "When I Was Your Man" (from the Rod Stewart album, Out of Order) (1988)
 Persuasion (several tracks on the Adam Ant album) (1992)
 "I Wanna Take You Higher" (from the Duran Duran album, Thank You) (1995)
 "What It Takes" (with Bobby Kimball from the compilation album, Tribute to Aerosmith: Let the Tribute Do the Talkin''') (2001)

Film appearances
 Appeared with Distance as the club band in the Whoopi Goldberg movie, Burglar'' (1987)

References

External links
 Chictribute.com
 Allmusic bio
 ArtistDirect discography
 Simple Mission - Glass Tiger 1990

1954 births
2003 deaths
African-American drummers
Deaths from kidney cancer
American funk drummers
American male drummers
The Power Station (band) members
Chic (band) members
Soul drummers
Musicians from Queens, New York
Deaths from cancer in California
20th-century American drummers
Rhythm and blues drummers
American people of Antigua and Barbuda descent
American people of Trinidad and Tobago descent
20th-century American male musicians
20th-century African-American musicians
21st-century African-American people